The Finland national under-17 football team represents Finland in international football competitions in the FIFA U-17 World Cup and the UEFA European Under-17 Championship, as well as any other under-17 international football tournaments. It is governed by the Football Association of Finland.

Competitive record

FIFA U-16/17 World Cup Record

UEFA European U-17 Championship record 

*Draws include knockout matches decided on penalty kicks.
**Gold background colour indicates that the tournament was won.
***Red border colour indicates tournament was held on home soil.

Recent results

Current squad
 The following players were called up for the 2023 UEFA European Under-17 Championship qualification.
 Match dates: 5–11 October 2022
 Opposition: ,  and 
Caps and goals correct as of: 8 October 2022, after the match against

Coaching staff

 Head coach: Erkka V. Lehtola
 Coach: Teemu Eskola
 Goalkeeping Coach: Eemeli Reponen
 Video Analyst: Juho Suuperko
 Doctor: Aapo Haavisto
 Physiotherapist: Niklas Virtanen
 Kit Manager: Jaakko Tawast
 Team Manager: Ville Sairanen

Minor tournaments
 Under-17 Baltic Cup
 Winners: 2011, 2013
 Runners-up: 2015, 2016, 2017, 2018
 Third-place: 2012, 2014
 Nordic Under-17 Football Championship
 Winners: 1999, 2013
 Runners-up: 1975, 2018
 Third-place: 1982, 1986, 1992, 1996, 2000, 2006

References

Notes

See also
 Finland men's national football team
 Finland men's national under-21 football team
 Finland men's national under-19 football team
 Finland women's national football team
 Finland women's national under-20 football team
 Finland women's national under-17 football team

European national under-17 association football teams
Finland national football team